The Boys Town Gang were a post-disco and hi-NRG band from San Francisco, California. Their popularity peaked in the 1980s when the group reached No. 1 in the Netherlands, Belgium and Spain as well as No. 4 in the UK with their cover of "Can't Take My Eyes Off You".

History
In 1980, DJ Bill Motley saw an opportunity to form a disco group that catered to San Francisco's large gay clientele. In his search to form a group, he auditioned hundreds of vocalists, both male and female. Local cabaret singer Cynthia Manley captured the lead spot.

The idea was originally for one 12" single with two tracks of high energy disco music. Motley, a Diana Ross fan, picked two Ashford & Simpson songs to form a medley for the A-side track. For the B-side track, he wrote a disco drama in four acts. A private record label was founded to release the two songs.

When "Remember Me"/"Ain't No Mountain High Enough" was released, the song took off with Manley's vocals propelling the song to the top of the club charts. The four-act explicit "Cruisin' the Streets" was a snapshot of San Francisco's South of Market District - Ringold Alley at sundown.

Manley departed after the release of these two records, and Jackson Moore took over lead-vocal responsibilities in 1981 for the group's second LP Disc Charge, which contained three pop charting disco cuts: "Can't Take My Eyes Off You", "Signed, Sealed, Delivered (I'm Yours)" (both of which were performed on Top of the Pops in 1981 and 1982) and "Come and Get Your Love". 

The group's last LP, A Cast of Thousands brought in fellow disco artists such as Debbie Jacobs, Two Tons O' Fun, Sylvester, Margaret Reynolds (KC and the Sunshine Band), and Marlena Shaw. With one more overseas hit, the group disbanded, and Jackson Moore took on a short-lived solo career until the decade came to a close.

Band members
On the records "Remember Me"/"Ain't No Mountain High Enough" and "Cruisin' the Streets", Cynthia Manley provided lead vocals with Robin Charin, Don Wood, Phill Manganello, Tom Morley, and Keith Stewart providing back-up vocals.

From the 1981 album Disc Charge, Jackson Moore was lead singer with Tom Morley and Bruce Carlton as back-up.

Discography

Albums
1981: Cruisin' the Streets
1982: Disc Charge
1984: A Cast of Thousands

Singles

See also
One-hit wonders in the UK

References

External links
High Fashion Music
Boys Town Gang discography

American disco musicians
American disco groups
American hi-NRG groups
Fantasy Records artists